There have been criticisms of perceived human rights violations related to the organisation and hosting of the 2022 FIFA World Cup in Qatar. There have long been concerns for the state of human rights in Qatar, with the state accused of sportswashing in hosting the World Cup.

A large concern in Qatar's hosting of the World Cup was the conditions of migrant workers brought in to build the required infrastructure, including indentured servitude and working conditions leading to deaths. The state of women's rights, and a British tourism executive hired to promote Qatar dying under suspicious circumstances have also been sources of controversy.

In a December 2021 interview with Al Jazeera, FIFA's secretary-general Fatma Samoura said that FIFA had developed a general framework to structure and guide the implementation of its human rights responsibilities and commitment, published in 2017, and that Qatar had implemented those recommendations.

Migrant workers

Indentured servitude

Kafala system 

One of the most discussed issues of the Qatar World Cup was the treatment of workers hired to build the infrastructure. Most Qatari nationals avoid doing manual work or low-skilled jobs. They are given preference in the workplace. In May 2014, Qatar announced plans to abolish the kafala system, but implementation was delayed until 2016, and even if the promised reforms are implemented, employers would still have considerable power over workers (for example, a proposed requirement that wages must be paid into a designated bank account would not cover labourers paid in cash).

Human Rights Watch and the International Trade Union Confederation (ITUC) state that the kafala system leaves migrants vulnerable to systematic abuse. Workers could not change jobs or even leave the country without their sponsor's permission. In November 2013, Amnesty International reported "serious exploitation", including workers having to sign false statements that they had received their wages in order to regain their passports. An investigation by The Guardian in the same year claimed had their identity papers taken away from them, were compelled to perform forced labor, and that they were not paid on time or at all, making some of them effectively slaves. The Guardian also reported that companies refused to pay salaries and administer necessary worker ID permits, rendering the workers illegal aliens and forcing them to stay. The report stated that there was evidence to suggest that workers face exploitation and abuse as defined by the International Labour Organization (ILO).

By 2015, Michael van Praag, president of the Royal Dutch Football Association, requested the FIFA Executive Committee to pressure Qatar over the allegations to ensure better workers' conditions. He also stated that a new vote on the attribution of the World Cup to Qatar would have to take place if the corruption allegations were to be proved. In March 2016, Amnesty International accused Qatar of using forced labour, forcing the employees to live in poor conditions, and withholding their wages and passports. It also accused FIFA of failing to act against the human rights abuses. Migrant workers told Amnesty about verbal abuse and threats they received after complaining about not being paid for up to several months. Nepali workers were denied leave to visit their family after the 2015 Nepal earthquake.

In August 2022, Qatari authorities arrested and deported over 60 migrant workers who protested about non-payment of wages by their employer, Al Bandary International Group, a major construction and hospitality firm. Some of the demonstrators, from Nepal, Bangladesh, India, Egypt and the Philippines, had not been paid for seven months. London-based labour rights body Equidem said most were sent home. Qatar's labour ministry said it was paying Al Bandary workers and taking further action against the company - already under investigation for failing to pay wages.

In September 2022, Amnesty published the results of a poll of over 17,000 football fans from 15 countries which showed 73% supported FIFA compensating migrant workers in Qatar for human rights violations. FIFA responded with a statement noting progress on Qatar's migrant worker policies, adding "FIFA will continue its efforts to enable remediation for workers who may have been adversely impacted in relation to FIFA World Cup-related work in accordance with its Human Rights Policy and responsibilities under relevant international standards."

On 24 November 2022, during the tournament, the European Parliament adopted a resolution requesting FIFA to help compensate the families of migrant workers who died in Qatar, and for Qatar conduct a full human rights investigation. Before the tournament was over, several individuals involved in the European Parliament had been arrested on charges of colluding in organised crime with Qatar, including aiming to improve Qatar's human rights reputation ahead of the World Cup.

Labour reforms 
In October 2017, the ITUC said that Qatar had signed an agreement to improve the situation of more than two million migrant workers in the country. According to the ITUC, the agreement provided for substantial reforms in the labour system, including ending the kafala system, and would positively affect the general situation of workers, especially those working on 2022 FIFA World Cup infrastructure projects. The workers would no longer need their employer's permission to leave the country or change their jobs. Amnesty International have questioned whether Qatar would complete the promised labour reforms before the start of the World Cup, a sentiment that FIFA backed. Amnesty International found that abuses were still occurring despite the nation taking some steps to improve labour rights. Law No. 13 of 2018 abolished exit visas for about 95 per cent of migrant workers. On 30 April 2018, the ILO opened its first project office in Qatar to monitor and support the implementation of the new labour laws. In February 2019, Amnesty International said Qatar was falling short on promised labour reforms before the start of the World Cup, a sentiment that FIFA backed. Amnesty also found that abuses were still occurring. In May 2019, an investigation by the UK's Daily Mirror newspaper discovered that some of the 28,000 workers on the stadiums were being paid 750 Qatari riyals per month, equivalent to £190 per month or 99 pence an hour for a typical 48-hour week. In October 2019, the ILO said that Qatar had taken steps towards upholding the rights of migrant workers.

In April 2020, the government of Qatar provided $824 million to pay the wages of migrant workers in quarantine or undergoing treatment for COVID-19. In August 2020, the Qatari government announced a monthly minimum wage for all workers of 1,000 riyals (US$275), an increase from the previous temporary minimum wage of 750 riyals a month. The new laws went into effect in March 2021. The ILO said "Qatar is the first country in the region to introduce a non-discriminatory minimum wage, which is a part of a series of historical reforms of the country's labour laws," but the campaign group Migrant Rights said the new minimum wage was too low to meet migrant workers' need with Qatar's high cost of living. In addition, employers are obligated to pay 300 riyals for food and 500 riyals for accommodation, if they do not provide employees with these directly. The No Objection Certificate was removed so that employees can change jobs without consent of the current employer. A Minimum Wage Committee was also formed to check on the implementation. These reforms removed the kafala system and a contractual system was introduced – the European Union's Annual Report on Human Rights and Democracy in the World 2021 noted Qatar's labour law reforms had incorporated non-discriminatory minimum wage systems and removal of the Kafala system in 2021.

At the March 2022 FIFA Congress in Doha, Lise Klaveness—head of the Norwegian Football Federation—criticised the organisation for having awarded the World Cup to Qatar, citing the various controversies surrounding the tournament. She argued that "in 2010 World Cups were awarded by FIFA in unacceptable ways with unacceptable consequences. Human rights, equality, democracy: the core interests of football were not in the starting XI until many years later. These basic rights were pressured onto the field as substitutes by outside voices. FIFA has addressed these issues but there's still a long way to go." Hassan al-Thawadi, secretary general of Qatar 2022, criticised her remarks for ignoring the country's recent labour reforms. In May 2022, Amnesty accused FIFA of looking the other way while thousands of migrants worked in conditions "amounting to forced labor", arguing that FIFA should have required labour protections as a condition of hosting. Apart from all the condemns, in an article on August 11, 2022 published by the LA Times, it was revealed that Qatar used the focus of the month-long tournament for bringing more progress to its migrant sector. “Human Rights Watch acknowledges and applauds the reforms the Supreme Committee has put in place,” said Minky Worden, the New York-based advocacy group’s director of global initiatives. Also, in a report published by ILO in November 2022, it was revealed that a new dedicated department for Occupational Health and Safety within Qatar’s Ministry of Labour is being created and it will focus on prevention of accidents at work and compliance of laws to protect workers along with overall betterment of the whole sector.

Shortly before the tournament began, France 24 broadcast a report titled "The plight of migrant workers in Qatar", adding more details to the controversy and how many reform laws have not been followed.

Conditions of workers 
The issue of migrant workers' rights attracted greater attention once the World Cup was awarded to Qatar, with the 2013 investigation by The Guardian claiming that many workers were denied food and water.

After visiting a labour camp in 2012, Sharan Burrows of the ITUC stated that "If two years on [since the award of the 2022 World Cup] the [Qatari] Government has not done the fundamentals, they have no commitment to human rights". The Qatar 2022 Committee said: "Our commitment is to change working conditions in order to ensure a lasting legacy of improved worker welfare. We are aware this cannot be done overnight. But the 2022 FIFA World Cup is acting as a catalyst for improvements in this regard." A video shown to labour rights groups in 2013 showed men living in dilapidated labour camps under unsanitary conditions.

In November 2017, the ILO started a three-year technical cooperation programme with Qatar to improve working conditions and labour rights. Qatar introduced new labour laws to protect migrant workers’ rights: Law No. 15 of 2017 introduced clauses on maximum working hours and constitutional rights to annual leave.

Deaths of migrant workers 
The Guardian estimated that, by the time the competition would be held, without reforms of the kafala system, out of the 2 million-strong migrant workforce up to 4,000 workers could die due to lax safety and other causes. These claims were based upon the fact that 522 Nepalese workers and over 700 Indian workers had died since 2010, when Qatar's bid as World Cup's host had been won, about 250 Indian workers dying each year. The Indian government said the number of deaths could be considered quite normal based on the figure of half a million Indians working in Qatar.

The Wall Street Journal reported in June 2015 the ITUC's claim that over 1,200 workers had died while working on infrastructure and real-estate projects related to the World Cup, and the Qatar Government's counter-claim that none had. The BBC later reported that this often-cited figure of 1,200 workers having died in World Cup construction in Qatar between 2011 and 2013 is not correct, and that the 1,200 number is instead representing deaths from all Indians and Nepalese working in Qatar, not just of those workers involved in the preparation for the World Cup, and not just of construction workers.

In 2019, the Planning and Statistics Authority of the State of Qatar reported that 15,021 non-Qataris had died between 2010 and 2019 in its Vital Statistics Annual Bulletin - Births & Deaths 2019.

In February 2021, another investigative report published by The Guardian used data from embassies and national foreign employment offices to estimate a death toll of 6,500 migrant workers since the World Cup was awarded to Qatar. The figures used by The Guardian did not include occupation or place of work so deaths could not be definitively associated with the World Cup construction programme, but "a very significant proportion of the migrant workers who have died since 2011 were only in the country because Qatar won the right to host the World Cup."

In a September 2021 report, Amnesty criticised Qatar for failing to investigate migrant workers' deaths.

Interactions with foreign companies 
In 2015, a crew of four journalists from the BBC were arrested and held for two days after they attempted to report on the condition of workers in the country. The reporters had been invited to visit the country as guests of the Government of Qatar. At the start of the tournament, the BBC refused to broadcast Qatar's 2022 FIFA World Cup opening ceremony, instead showing a panel discussion led by host Gary Lineker delivering a critique of Qatar's records on LGBT rights and treatment of migrant workers. Jim Waterson of The Guardian commented that the Qatari authorities "probably hoped [the opening ceremony] would be the moment when the global media finally focused on football rather than human rights".

In March 2021, Hendriks Graszoden, the turf supplier for the 2006 World Cup and for the European Championships in 2008 and 2016, refused to supply Qatar with World Cup turf. According to company spokesperson Gerdien Vloet, one reason for this decision was the accusations of human rights abuses.

On September 28, 2022, Danish sportswear company Hummel unveiled Denmark's "toned down" kits for the tournament in protest of Qatar's human rights record. One of these kits includes a black alternate kit that represents "the color of mourning", which references the dispute between Hummel and World Cup organisers in Qatar in which Hummel claimed that thousands of migrant workers died during the construction of the venues. Hummel said in their statement on their official Instagram:
Singer Dua Lipa denied speculations that she would be performing in Qatar, stating in her Instagram Stories post that she looked "forward to visiting Qatar when it has fulfilled all the human rights pledges it made when it won the right to host the World Cup." Rod Stewart, meanwhile, claimed he had refused over $1 million to perform at the tournament.

Defenses of Qatar and FIFA 
In March 2022, FIFA president Gianni Infantino claimed in an interview that the Gulf nation is being progressive in terms of the labour rights and migrant rights issues that prevailed previously, adding "I am pleased to see the strong commitment from the Qatari authorities to ensure the reforms are fully implemented across the labour market, leaving a lasting legacy of the FIFA World Cup long after the event, and benefiting migrant workers in the host country in the long term."

In a news conference preceding the tournament on 19 November 2022, Infantino defended criticism of Qatar from the West as hypocritical, stating that "I think for what we Europeans have been doing for 3,000 years around the world, we should be apologising for the next 3,000 years before starting to give moral lessons to people." He asked, "how many of these European companies who earn millions and millions from Qatar or other countries in the region—billions every year—how many of them have addressed migrant worker rights? I have the answer: none of them, because if they change the legislation it means less profits. But we did. And FIFA generated much, much, much less than any of these companies, from Qatar."

Amid popular criticism, political commentary magazine The Economist also provided a defence for FIFA's choice, stating that Qatar was "a more suitable country to host a big sporting event" than both China and Russia, who hosted the 2022 Winter Olympics and the 2018 World Cup respectively, and who both have arguably worse human rights records. Moreover, it added that "Western criticism" failed to "distinguish between truly repugnant regimes and merely flawed ones", and that many "indignant pundits" simply sounded as if they did "not like Muslims or rich people".

Death of Marc Bennett 

Marc Bennett was a British travel advisor who died under mysterious circumstances in Doha. Bennett was employed by the Qatar Airways company Discover Qatar to promote the image of Qatar following the nation's selection as the host of the World Cup. After leaving the job and showing interest in a rival Saudi company, Bennett was arrested and tortured. He was found hanged in his hotel room on 25 December 2019. Following his death, Qatar Airways reported that he was arrested for stealing company secrets. The Qatari authorities said that he killed himself, Qatar Airways said this was unrelated to his work because he was a popular and valued former employee. Bennett's family dispute both stories; a British coroner did not record the death as suicide.

Women's rights 
Discrimination against women was also criticized. Women in Qatar must obtain permission from their male guardians to marry, study abroad on government scholarships, work in many government jobs, travel abroad, receive certain forms of reproductive health care, and act as the primary guardian of children, even if they are divorced.

In February 2022, a Mexican employee of the World Cup Organizing Committee working as an economist was accused of allegedly having sex outside of marriage. The woman had previously reported rape. However, the male claimed to have been in a relationship with her, after which the woman was investigated for extramarital sex. Women in Qatar face the possible penalty of flagellation and a seven-year prison sentence if convicted for having sex outside of marriage. The criminal case against the Organizing Committee employee was dropped months after she was allowed to leave Qatar. Human Rights Watch welcomed the decision to close the case.

References

FIFA World Cup controversies